The Belfast and County Down Railway (BCDR) Class 28 locomotive was speculatively built by Harland and Wolff in 1937.  It remained operational until withdrawn and scrapped in 1973, retaining its number 28 having 6 owners in its lifetime.

References 

1A-A1 locomotives
Railway locomotives introduced in 1937
5 ft 3 in gauge locomotives
Diesel-electric locomotives of Northern Ireland
Scrapped locomotives